Palpopleura vestita, commonly known as the silver widow, is a species of dragonfly in the family Libellulidae. It is widespread in Madagascar, where it has been observed in a variety of habitats, including rice paddies, ponds and swamps.

References

External links

Libellulidae
Insects described in 1842